Al-Fotuwa Sport Club, is an Iraqi football team based in Mosul, that plays in the Iraq Division Two.

Managerial history
 Mowaffaq Mahmoud

See also 
 1988–89 Iraq FA Cup
 2021–22 Iraq Division Two

References

External links
 Iraq Clubs- Foundation Dates

1960 establishments in Iraq
Association football clubs established in 1960
Football clubs in Nineveh